Sandside or Sand Side may refer to:
Sandside, Beetham, hamlet in the parish of Beetham, South Lakeland, Cumbria, England
Sandside railway station, its former station on the Hincaster Branch of the Furness Railway
Sandside, Ulverston, a location near Ulverston, South Lakeland, Cumbria, England
Sand Side, one of the hamlets making up Kirkby-in-Furness, South Lakeland, Cumbria, England
Sandside Bay in the parish of  Reay, Caithness, Scotland
Sandside Chase a clan battle in 1437 at this location